Alejandro Nicholas Mayorkas (born November 24, 1959) is an American government official and attorney who has been serving as the seventh United States Secretary of Homeland Security since February 2, 2021. During the Obama administration, he also served in the Department of Homeland Security, first as director of United States Citizenship and Immigration Services (2009–2013), and then as deputy secretary of DHS (2013–2016).

Mayorkas was born in Havana, Cuba. Shortly after the Cuban Revolution, his family fled to Florida and later settled in California. He graduated from UC Berkeley in history with honors, subsequently earning his J.D. from Loyola Marymount University. After law school, Mayorkas worked as an Assistant United States Attorney and was appointed the United States attorney for the
Central District of California in Los Angeles during the administration of President Bill Clinton and George W. Bush, where he oversaw the prosecution of high-profile criminal cases.

Mayorkas was a member of the presidential transition team for Barack Obama before he assumed office in January 2009, where he led the team responsible for the U.S. Department of Justice's Criminal Division. Mayorkas was appointed by President Obama as the director of U.S. Citizenship and Immigration Services (USCIS). On May 20, 2009, the nomination was received by the Senate; on August 7, 2009, the nomination was confirmed by the Senate by voice vote. As USCIS director, Mayorkas led United States citizenship through management efficiencies and fiscal responsibility, and safeguarded the integrity of the immigration system. He implemented the Deferred Action for Childhood Arrivals (DACA) process in sixty days. He led U.S. government efforts to rescue orphaned children following the January 2010 earthquake in Haiti and led the advancement of a crime victims unit that, for the first time, resulted in the ability of the agency to administer the statutory maximum number of visas to victims of crime.

In 2016, Mayorkas became a partner at the law firm of Wilmer Cutler Pickering Hale and Dorr, in their Washington, D.C., office. On November 23, 2020, President-elect Joe Biden announced he would nominate Mayorkas as secretary of homeland security in his Cabinet. Mayorkas's nomination received the endorsement of the Fraternal Order of Police and former secretaries Tom Ridge, Michael Chertoff (who served under George W. Bush), Janet Napolitano and Jeh Johnson (under whom Mayorkas served), who said Biden "could not have found a more qualified person". On February 2, 2021, Mayorkas was confirmed by the Senate on a 56–43 vote, with significant Senate Republican opposition. He was sworn in by Vice President Kamala Harris on February 2, 2021. Mayorkas is the first refugee and first person born in Latin America to lead the department.

Early life and education
Alejandro Nicholas Mayorkas was born in Havana, Cuba, on November 24, 1959. When he was one year old, his parents fled with him and his sister to the United States in 1960 as refugees, following the Cuban Revolution. He lived in Miami, Florida, before his family moved to Los Angeles, California, where he was raised for the remainder of his youth. Mayorkas grew up in Beverly Hills and attended Beverly Hills High School.

His father, Charles R. "Nicky" Mayorkas, was born in Cuba. He was a Cuban Jew of Sephardi (from the former Ottoman Empire, present-day Turkey and Greece) and Ashkenazi (from Poland) background. He owned and operated a steel wool factory on the outskirts of Havana. Nicky Mayorkas studied economics at Dartmouth College.

His mother, Anita (Gabor), was a Romanian Jew whose family escaped the Holocaust and fled to Cuba in the 1940s before leaving to the United States after the Cuban Revolution.

Mayorkas earned his Bachelor of Arts degree with distinction from the University of California, Berkeley, in 1981. He received his Juris Doctor from Loyola Law School in 1985.

Assistant United States Attorney

After three years as a litigation associate in private practice, Mayorkas became an Assistant United States Attorney in the Central District of California in 1989. He prosecuted a wide array of federal crimes, developing a specialization in the prosecution of white-collar crime, including tax evasion and money laundering. His prosecutions included the successful prosecution of Operation PolarCap, then the largest money laundering case in the nation; the conviction at trial of Heidi Fleiss on charges of federal conspiracy, tax fraud, and money laundering charges; the successful prosecutions of two largest telemarketing fraud operations that preyed on the elderly; and the successful prosecution of a health care fraud and insurance fraud conspiracy.

Mayorkas served as the coordinator of the Southern California Telemarketing Fraud Task Force, overseeing the coordination of federal, state, and local law enforcement and regulatory agencies to most aggressively combat telemarketing fraud throughout the Central District of California.

From 1996 to 1998, Mayorkas served as Chief of the Office's General Crimes Section, overseeing the training and trial work of all new Assistant United States Attorneys in the Criminal Division. He received numerous awards from federal law enforcement agencies, including from FBI Director Louis Freeh for the successful prosecution of Operation PolarCap.

United States Attorney

In 1998, Mayorkas was recommended by Senator Dianne Feinstein and appointed by President Bill Clinton as the United States Attorney for the Central District of California, becoming the country's youngest United States Attorney. He was appointed on December 21, 1998.

Mayorkas oversaw the prosecution of high-profile criminal cases, including the prosecution of the Mexican Mafia in death penalty proceedings, the prosecution of Buford O. Furrow Jr. for the murder of a federal postal worker and the hate-motivated shooting of children in a community center, the prosecution of Litton Industries for the payment of bribes abroad, and the takedown of the violent 18th Street gang using RICO statutes.

In late 2000, Mayorkas was one of many California officials who participated in efforts to obtain executive clemency for narcotics trafficker Carlos Vignali Jr., the son of a wealthy Los Angeles businessman. On his last day in office in January 2001, Clinton commuted Vignali's 15-year prison sentence, a controversial decision.

Private law practice
In September 2001, Mayorkas joined O'Melveny & Myers as a litigation partner. In 2008, The National Law Journal named Mayorkas one of the "50 Most Influential Minority Lawyers in America".

Upon the election of Barack Obama in November 2008, Mayorkas was selected by the president-elect for a role in the presidential transition leading up to the inauguration. He led the transition team responsible for the U.S. Department of Justice's Criminal Division.

Obama administration, 2009–2016

Director of U.S. Citizenship and Immigration Services 
In 2009, Mayorkas was appointed by President Obama as the director of U.S. Citizenship and Immigration Services (USCIS). On May 20, 2009, the nomination was received by the Senate; on August 7, 2009, the nomination was confirmed by the Senate by voice vote. As USCIS director, Mayorkas led United States citizenship through management efficiencies and fiscal responsibility, and safeguarding the integrity of the immigration system. He implemented the Deferred Action for Childhood Arrivals (DACA) process in sixty days. He led U.S. government efforts to rescue orphaned children following the January 2010 earthquake in Haiti and led the advancement of a crime victims unit that, for the first time, resulted in the ability of the agency to administer the statutory maximum number of visas to victims of crime.

For his work as director of USCIS, Mayorkas received awards from the Illinois Coalition for Immigrant and Refugee Rights, the Coalition for Humane Immigrant Rights of Los Angeles, and the Mexican American Legal Defense and Education Fund.

In 2015, a Department of Homeland Security inspector general (DHS IG) report criticized Mayorkas' oversight of the EB-5 investor visa program, which offered lawful permanent resident status (green cards) to foreign investors who invested $500,000 into businesses that created jobs in the U.S. The program's popularity greatly increased under Mayorkas's tenure. The DHS IG report, which was the culmination of an investigation beginning in 2013, focused on allegations that politically connected businesses were given special treatment under the program, focusing specifically on the Sahara casino and hotel in Las Vegas, backed by then-Senate Majority Leader Harry Reid, and an electric car company led by Terry McAuliffe and involving Anthony Rodham. The report concluded that "The juxtaposition of Mr. Mayorkas' communication with external stakeholders on specific matters outside the normal procedures, coupled with favorable action that deviated from the regulatory scheme designed to ensure fairness and evenhandedness in adjudicating benefits, created an appearance of favoritism and special access." The "fast-tracking" of approvals for individuals involved in the casino program was controversial because it was made over the objections of USCIS analysts "who were suspicious about the source of the funds".

Deputy Secretary of Homeland Security 
Nominated by President Obama in June 2013, Mayorkas was confirmed as the deputy secretary on December 20, 2014, following a party-line Senate vote.

The DHS inspector general's investigation into Mayorkas's intervention as USCIS director to expedite reviews for applicants for foreign investor visas in three cases caused controversy and delayed his confirmation proceedings. The inspector general's report found that Mayorkas's acts did not violate the law, but did create an appearance of favoritism. In House Homeland Security Committee testimony in May 2015, Mayorkas expressed regret that his intervention created an impression of favoritism, but said his involvement was motivated by a desire to ensure that the applications were handled in accordance with the law: "I did not let errors go unchecked, but instead helped ensure that those cases were decided correctly, nothing more and nothing less."

As deputy secretary, Mayorkas's led DHS's response to the 2013–14 Ebola virus epidemic and 2015–16 Zika virus epidemic. His work also focused on cybersecurity. He led the DHS's negotiations with Israel and China on cybersecurity. A landmark agreement reached in 2015 with the Chinese government reduced, for a brief period, Chinese cyberattacks against American companies aimed at the theft of intellectual property. After the normalization of U.S.-Cuba relations, Mayorkas led the Obama administration's delegation to Cuba, and negotiated with the Cuban government on port and cargo security and U.S.-Cuba travel.

Mayorkas was also involved in the Department's counterterrorism and anti-cybercrime efforts, as well as its public-private partnerships, and efforts to fight antisemitism. Under Mayorkas's tenure, DHS greatly expanded its Cyber Crimes Center in Fairfax, Virginia, to aid the department's efforts to combat various cybercrimes, ranging from child exploitation to computer hacking and intellectual property theft. Mayorkas was involved in efforts to address DHS's presence on GAO's "high risk list" for management challenges; Mayorkas, as well as Homeland Security Secretary Jeh Johnson, acknowledged low morale among DHS employees (a longstanding problem that pre-dated the Obama administration) and took steps aimed at boosting morale.

Return to private practice, 2017–2020
In October 2016, Mayorkas joined the law firm of Wilmer Cutler Pickering Hale and Dorr in the firm's Washington office.

Biden administration, 2021–present

Secretary of Homeland Security
On November 23, 2020, President-elect Joe Biden announced his plan to nominate Mayorkas to be Secretary of Homeland Security.
Mayorkas has the support of the Fraternal Order of Police and endorsements from former secretaries Tom Ridge and Michael Chertoff (who served under George W. Bush) and Janet Napolitano and Jeh Johnson (who served under Barack Obama), who said Biden "could not have found a more qualified person". Most Senate Republicans however opposed the nomination; Josh Hawley delayed a speedy confirmation, and Senate Minority Leader Mitch McConnell urged his caucus to vote against confirmation. 

Ultimately, Mayorkas was confirmed on a 56–43 vote. Republican Senators Shelley Moore Capito, Rob Portman, Susan Collins, Mitt Romney, Lisa Murkowski, and Dan Sullivan voted with the Democrats to confirm Mayorkas. Mayorkas was sworn in by Vice President Kamala Harris on February 2, 2021, after his confirmation that day.

Tenure 
Early on in his tenure, arrests surged at the Mexico-United States border. In June 2021, the monthly number of intercepted migrants reached a decade high of 188,800.

On October 19, 2021, Mayorkas tested positive for COVID-19 during a test performed as part of pre-travel protocol. He experienced mild symptoms, forcing him to cancel a trip to Bogotá, Colombia, and to reschedule a Senate hearing.

Testifying to the Homeland Security Subcommittee of the House Committee on Appropriations on April 27, 2022, Mayorkas confirmed that the Biden Administration will implement a "Disinformation Working Group" in the DHS with the intention to "develop guidelines, standards, [and] guardrails" to shape the department's longstanding effort to counter disinformation. Three weeks later, after critics called the initiative "a violation of free speech" and its executive director Nina Jankowicz had resigned, the Disinformation Working Group was "paused".

In September 2021, a photo circulated of Border Patrol agents using their "long rein" to control horses, however the photo appeared to show them "whipping" Haitian migrants. Upon its release, the image generated outrage. Initially, Mayorkas defended the actions of agents, but later, at a White House press conference, condemned their actions and pledged to investigate them. In October 2022, the Heritage Foundation released emails that showed hours before the press conference Mayorkas received emails that disproved the whipping claim, including from the photographer himself. Republicans condemned Mayorkas upon the emails release. Senator Ted Cruz, Representatives Andy Biggs, Michael Cloud and Vicky Hartzler had, by October 2022, raised the prospect of impeaching Mayorkas. Chief of the United States Border Patrol under President Obama and acting Commissioner of U.S. Customs and Border Protection under President Trump Mark A. Morgan also condemned Mayorkas's actions.

Personal life
Mayorkas and his wife Tanya have two daughters, Giselle and Amelia. He is a runner and plays tennis and squash.

References

Sources

External links

Biography at the United States Department of Homeland Security
Biography at the United States Department of Homeland Security (2013–2017, archived)

1959 births
20th-century American lawyers
21st-century American lawyers
American people of Cuban-Jewish descent
American people of Romanian-Jewish descent
American people of Turkish-Jewish descent
American politicians of Cuban descent
Beverly Hills High School alumni
Biden administration cabinet members
California lawyers
Cuban Jews
Cuban emigrants to the United States
Cuban people of Sephardic-Jewish descent
Jewish American attorneys
Jewish American members of the Cabinet of the United States
Hispanic and Latino American members of the Cabinet of the United States
Lawyers from Washington, D.C.
Living people
Loyola Law School alumni
Obama administration personnel
People associated with O'Melveny & Myers
People from Beverly Hills, California
People from Havana
United States Attorneys for the Central District of California
United States Deputy Secretaries of Homeland Security
United States Secretaries of Homeland Security
University of California, Berkeley alumni
Wilmer Cutler Pickering Hale and Dorr partners
Biden administration personnel